Antero González de Audicana Inchaurraga (16 April 1901 – 28 January 1978) was a Spanish footballer and manager whose career was mostly associated with Deportivo Alavés. He competed in the men's tournament at the 1928 Summer Olympics.

References

External links
 

1901 births
1978 deaths
Spanish footballers
Spain international footballers
Olympic footballers of Spain
Footballers at the 1928 Summer Olympics
People from Durango, Biscay
Association football midfielders
Footballers from the Basque Country (autonomous community)
Deportivo Alavés players
Segunda División players
La Liga players
SD Eibar footballers
Spanish football managers
Deportivo Alavés managers
Segunda División managers
Barakaldo CF footballers
Sportspeople from Biscay